FCH domain only protein 2 is a protein that in humans is encoded by the FCHO2 gene.

References

Further reading